The 2017 term of the Supreme Court of the United States began October 2, 2017, and concluded September 30, 2018. The table below illustrates which opinion was filed by each justice in each case and which justices joined each opinion.

Table key

2017 term opinions

2017 term membership and statistics
This was the thirteenth term of Chief Justice Roberts's tenure. Justice Kennedy retired on July 31, 2018, making it the second and final (and also the only full) term with the same membership.

Notes

References

 
 

Lists of United States Supreme Court opinions by term